Planet E Communications is an independent electronic music recording label that started in 1991 in Detroit, Michigan. The label was founded by DJ/Producer Carl Craig.

Planet E's first release was titled “Four Jazz Funk Classics,” which Craig recorded under the moniker 69. Initial releases on Planet E would mainly be Craig's projects under a multitude of monikers, but would later evolve into being home to a myriad of electronic music's most influential artists such as Kevin Saunderson, Moodymann, Kenny Larkin, and Recloose. In 2001, Planet E celebrated its 10-year anniversary with a celebration at the Detroit Electronic Music Festival. Planet E is continually developing a roster, with producers such as Martin Buttrich, Jona, Ican, Glimpse and more.

In addition, Planet E has a subsidiary label, Community Projects. Craig developed this label to present music of other genres, everything from afro blues to space jazz to world music.

Discography
69 - 4 Jazz Funk Classics
Various - A.R.T. Compilation
Piece - Free Your Mind
Florence / Wladimir M - Eevolute
Various - Intergalactic Beats
Shop / Innerzone Orchestra - Untitled
69 - Sound On Sound
Quadrant - Infinition
Connection Machine - Bitflower
Paperclip People - Throw / Remake (Basic Reshape)
Various - Elements Of And Experiments With Sound
Flexitone - Nausicaä
69 - Lite Music
Clark - Lofthouse
Flexitone - Rotoreliefs EP
Gemini - A Moment Of Insanity
4th Wave - Touched
Designer Music - Remix Vol. 1
Fusion - Never Forget It
Paperclip People - The Secret Tapes Of Dr. Eich
Psyche / BFC - Elements 1989-1990
Innerzone Orchestra - Bug In The Bass Bin
Piece - Free Your Mind [Past] / Free Your Soul [Future]
Paperclip People - Floor
Paperclip People - Steam
Carl Craig - More Songs About Food And Revolutionary Art
Moodymann - Dem Young Sconies / Bosconi
Moodymann - Silentintroduction
Kevin Saunderson - Faces & Phases - The Saunderson Collection
Chaz Vincent - Dream Zenith
Recloose - So This Is The Dining Room
Common Factor - Common Factor EP
Moodymann - Sunday Morning
Paperclip People - 4 My Peepz
E-Dancer - Heavenly
Common Factor - Expanded EP
Alton Miller - EP
Common Factor - Dreams Of Elsewhere
Jason Hogans - Peter And The Rooster EP
Various - Intergalactic Beats
Paperclip People - 4 My Peepz
Jason Hogans - Peter And The Rooster EP
Common Factor - Pisces Groove
Innerzone Orchestra - Programmed
Recloose - Spelunking EP
Paperclip People - Throw / Remake (Basic Reshape)
Various Geology - A Subjective History Of Planet E - Volume One
Innerzone Orchestra Featuring Paul Randolph - People Make The World Go Round
Recloose - Can't Take It
Common Factor + John Redmond - Fascination / World Is Mine
Innerzone Orchestra - People Make The World Go Round 2
Agent-X - In The Morning EP
Designer Music - Problemz / The Truth
Carl Craig - Designer Music V1
Ibex - Oasis
Recloose - Can't Take It (Remixes)
Various - Geology - A Subjective Study Of Planet E - Volume Two
Ibex - Macamba
Various - 2000 Black: The Good Good
Carl Craig - The Climax
Various - All Access To Detroit's Music Festivals
Paperclip People - Clear And Present / Tweakityourself
Newworldaquarium - Tresspassers / NY
Recloose - Ain't Changin'
Recloose - Cardiology
Todd Sines + Natacha Labelle - Overlap
Todd Sines + Natacha Labelle - Overlap: C² Mixes
Carl Craig - A Wonderful Life / As Time Goes By
Urban Tribe - Covert Action / Low Berth
Recloose - Cardiology
Detroit Experiment - The Detroit Experiment
Niko Marks - Chune / Truly Something
Tres Demented - Demented
Designer Music - Good Girls
Carl Craig - Just Another Day
69 - Sound On Sound
Paperclip People - Throw / The Climax
Psyche - Elements / Neurotic Behavior
69 - 4 Jazz Funk Classics
Naomi Daniel - Feel The Fire / Stars
Paperclip People 4 My Peeps
Carl Craig - Sparkle / Home Entertainment
Carl Craig - Darkness (Radioslave Re-edit)
Carl Craig - The Album Formerly Known As...
Carl Craig - Darkness / Angel
69 - Pungtang
Tres Demented - Shez Satan
Ican - A Quien
Martin Buttrich - Full Clip / Programmer
Vince Watson - Renaissance / Rendezvous
Carl Craig - From The Vault: Planet E Classics Collection Vol. 1
Carl Craig - Just Another Day
Lazy Fat People - Pixelgirl EP
Carl Craig - Paris Live
Kevin Saunderson - History Elevate 1
Attias - Analysis
Tribe - Livin' In A New Day
Kevin Saunderson - History Elevate 2
Sebastien San - Rising Sun
Tribes - Vibes From The Tribe
Martin Buttrich - Stoned Autopilot
Jona - Altiplano
Kenny Larkin - You Are...
Ican - Pa' Mi Gente / Chiclet's Theme
Kenny Larkin - Keys, Strings, Tambourines
note: items in bold are Carl Craig productions or releases containing music by Carl Craig.

References
Footnotes

Further reading
 Planet E inks deal with MTV Urge.

External links
 Planet E Communications discography at Discogs.

American record labels
Companies based in Detroit
Techno record labels